California's 30th district may refer to:

 California's 30th congressional district
 California's 30th State Assembly district
 California's 30th State Senate district